Gambela or Gambella may refer to:

Places
 Gambela Region, Ethiopia
 Gambela, Ethiopia, a city and separate woreda in Gambela Region
 Gambela Zuria, Greater Gambela, a woreda surrounding the city of Gambela
 Gambela National Park
 Apostolic Vicariate of Gambella

People
 Ittocorre Gambella (fl. 1127–1140), regent of the Giudicato of Logudoro
 Marta Gambella (born 1974), Italian Olympic softball player

See also
 Babo Gambela, a woreda of the Oromia Region, Ethiopia